Friedrich W. Rainer (28 July 1903  –  November 1950) was an Austrian Nazi politician, Gauleiter as well as a Reichsstatthalter of Salzburg and Carinthia. He is the only Austrian governor who has ever held the same office in two separate states.

Personal background
Rainer was a native of Sankt Veit an der Glan in Carinthia, the son of a German nationalist vocational teacher at a municipal Bürgerschule (secondary school). His father, Norbert, was a member of the German Democratic Party (Deutsche Demokratische Partei/DDP), and later the Greater German People's Party (Großdeutsche Volkspartei/GDVP). He attended the Realgymnasium in Klagenfurt and, having obtained his Matura degree, studied law at the University of Graz while he earned his living by working in a local banking institution or in general labour. After successfully completing his law examination, Rainer began working in a notary's office and completed his doctorate in 1926. From 1931 he worked as a notary public in Klagenfurt. He married Ada Pflüger on 21 May 1932. The couple had five children: three daughters and two sons.

Political involvement
Beginning in high-school, Rainer had been a member of right-wing organizations in Sankt Veit. He also participated in the armed Austro-Slovene conflict in Carinthia. Prior to his graduation from law school in Graz, he joined the Austrian SA in 1923 and joined a Burschenschaft student fraternity. In October 1930, Rainer joined the Nazi Party establishing the local branch in Sankt Veit. A close friend of Odilo Globocnik, he joined the Austrian SS at the end of 1933. 

That same year he took up a post at the office of Nazi Gauleiter Hubert Klausner in Klagenfurt. As the Nazi Party had been banned by the Austrian government under Chancellor Engelbert Dollfuss in 1933, Rainer was in August 1935 sentenced to one year in police custody, presumably for high treason. He was released early for good behaviour the following March, nevertheless like Klausner and his deputy Globocnik he had to step down from his administrative role in the party, transferring sole leadership to the rival Austrian Nazi leader Josef Leopold. As Leopold soon fell out of favour with Adolf Hitler, Rainer was in May 1936 again assigned to the Nazi Party's provincial body in Carinthia.

Gauleiter and Reich Governor
In the course of the Austrian Anschluss to Nazi Germany on 13 March 1938, Rainer was recruited to serve as the organizational staff leader in the office of Josef Bürckel, the Reichskommissar responsible for the annexation of the Austrian lands. On 22 May 1938, Rainer was personally appointed by Hitler as Gauleiter of the Nazi Party in the Reichsgau Salzburg. Upon the 1938 elections, he also was elected a member of the Reichstag in Berlin.  

When World War II broke out, Rainer was appointed as Reich Defense Commissioner of Wehrkreis (Military District) XVIII, headquartered in Salzburg, which comprised his Reichsgau along with Reichsgau Carinthia, Reichsgau Styria and Reichsgau Tirol-Vorarlberg. This gave him control of civil defense matters over a very large area. On 15 March 1940, he was additionally appointed as the Reichsstatthalter (Reich Governor) of Salzburg, thus uniting under his control the highest party and governmental offices in his jurisdiction. Rainer remained in these offices at Salzburg until 27 November 1941, when he was succeeded by Gustav Adolf Scheel. 

On 27 November 1941, Rainer was appointed as the Gauleiter and Reichsstatthalter of Reichsgau Carinthia, which also involved ruling over the adjacent occupied Yugoslavian territories in Upper Carniola. On 16 November 1942, Rainer was made Reich Defense Commissioner of Carinthia. On 21 June 1943 he was promoted to SS–Obergruppenführer. After Italy abandoned its German ally on 8 September 1943, Rainer took over the Operational Zone of the Adriatic Littoral as High Commissioner. This act established him as the chief of the civil administration in the Italian region of Friuli, as well as in Yugoslavian Istria and Inner Carniola.

Sentencing and death
On 7 May 1945, eight days after Hitler's suicide, Rainer transferred his official functions to an executive board and fled to the mountainous area around the Weißensee lake in Carinthia. After being given leads by the local population, British occupation troops arrested Rainer and transferred him to Nuremberg Prison in October 1945. On 12/13 June 1946, he appeared at the Nuremberg Trials as a defence witness for the former Austrian chancellor Dr Arthur Seyss-Inquart.

On 13 March 1947, Rainer was extradited to Yugoslavia. Here he wrote an 80-page work on the Nürnberg Trials for Yugoslav authorities. On 10 July 1947, he was brought before a military court of the Yugoslav 4th Army at Ljubljana. He was found guilty of crimes against the people and sentenced to death by hanging on 19 July 1947. His widow received a death certificate from Yugoslavia after the war, which showed that same date. For decades afterward, the date of his execution was unknown and could only be speculated. In 2010, documentation came to light in the Slovenian National Archives in Ljubljana which may well have answered the question. An entry in the diary of Boris Kraigher, former interior minister in Slovenia, indicates that Dr Rainer was executed with a number of other prisoners in late November 1950. He would have been 47 years old if this is correct. The long delay in Rainer's execution is reportedly due to Tito's secret police having utilized him as an informant. Upwards of 3,000 pages of his words, written from the Summer of 1947 through late 1949, and probably into 1950, have been deposited in the Slovenian National Archives.

Published works 
 Rainer, Friedrich. On Brecht and Eisenstein, New York: Telos Press, issue 31, 1977.
 Rainer, Friedrich. My Internment and Testimony at the Nuremberg War Crimes Trial, Edwin Mellen Press Ltd; illustrated edition, 2006;

Awards and decorations
Degen (SS), 01.12.1938
Anschluss Medal, c.1938
Golden Party Badge, 30.01.1939
Sudetenland Medal, c.1939
Honour Chevron for the Old Guard
SS-Ehrenring, 30.01.1942
War Merit Cross 2nd Class Without Swords
War Merit Cross 1st Class Without Swords
Nazi Party Long Service Award in Bronze
Nazi Party Long Service Award in Silver
Order of Civil Merit (Bulgaria) 2nd Class
Golden Hitler Youth Badge with Oak Leaves

Notes

References
 

External links 

Friedrich Rainer and Odilo Globocnik at Holocaust Education Archive & Reserarch Team (H.E.A.R.T)

1903 births
1950 deaths
Austrian people executed abroad
Executed Austrian Nazis
Gauleiters
Governors of Carinthia (state)
Governors of Salzburg (state)
Lawyers in the Nazi Party
Members of the Reichstag of Nazi Germany
Nazi Party officials
Nazi Party politicians
Nazis executed by Yugoslavia by hanging
People extradited from Germany
People extradited to Yugoslavia
People from the Duchy of Carinthia
People from Sankt Veit an der Glan
SS-Obergruppenführer
Sturmabteilung officers